Claudia Lee (born Claudia Lee Mirkowski) is an American actress and singer who is best known for her roles as Magnolia Breeland on Hart of Dixie, as Bridget on Zeke and Luther, and as Whitney in The Outcasts.

Early life
Lee was born Claudia Lee Mirkowski in Lafayette, Indiana, to Denise and Klaudius Mirkowski. At the age of 3, her parents enrolled her in dance classes, where she studied ballet, jazz and tap-dancing for 10 years. When she was 8 years old, Lee expressed a desire to learn her father’s native language, Polish, so her parents sent her to school in Poznań, Poland for one month every summer for five years. Claudia also has an older brother who with whom she shares a "great bond" and influences her characters.

Long interested in music, Lee began taking piano lessons when she was 10. At age 13, she attended the School of Creative and Performing Arts (SOCAPA) summer camp in Vermont. There, her roommate introduced Lee to an agent from Hollywood who was instrumental in bringing her to Los Angeles.

Career

Acting
Lee and her family arrived in Hollywood in January 2010. Within her first few weeks, Lee landed a role in a national TV commercial for Comcast with actor Zachary Levi (Chuck, Less Than Perfect). She was then cast in a short film, The Circus Girl, as Elizaveta, a young Russian villain who is traveling with a struggling circus family.

Following The Circus Girl, Lee went on to television series Zeke and Luther and Hart of Dixie. In August 2012, Lee was cast in the Universal Studios film Kick-Ass 2, which was based on the second volume of the Kick-Ass comic book series by Mark Millar and John Romita, Jr. The film, directed by Jeff Wadlow, was released in August 2013.

In 2014, Lee appeared in the Fox comedy series Surviving Jack.

Singing
In 2010 Lee began working with music producer Max DiCarlo. In November of that year, Lee released her first song and music video, "It Gets Better", inspired by a national campaign aimed at stopping bullying.  Lee's debut album, Here Right Now, was released in February 2012. "Hollywood Sunset", a song on the album, had previously been released in September 2011. The next two singles from the album, the country-rap song "3 Leaf Clover", and "Take My Hand" that Lee performed on Hart of Dixie, were released in 2012.

Filmography

References
 Footnotes

 General sources
 Article in Billboard.com
 Article in Faze Magazine
 Article in Seventeen Magazine
 Article in Talk TV World
 Article in Talk Tunes World
 Article in The Hollywood Reporter
 Article in ClevverTV
 Article in Character Grades

External links 
 
 
 Claudia Lee on FanAccess
 Hollywood Sunset on YouTube
 It Gets Better on YouTube
 3 Leaf Clover on YouTube

1996 births
Living people
Actresses from Indiana
American child actresses
American child singers
American film actresses
American people of Polish descent
American television actresses
People from Lafayette, Indiana
Singer-songwriters from Indiana
21st-century American actresses
21st-century American singers